A bronze replica of Myron's Discobolus is installed on the Harvard University campus in Cambridge, Massachusetts, United States.

References

External links

 
 Discobolus – Cambridge, MA at Waymarking

Bronze sculptures in Massachusetts
Harvard University
Nude sculptures in the United States
Outdoor sculptures in Cambridge, Massachusetts
Sculptures of men in Massachusetts
Sculptures of sports
Statues in Massachusetts